No More Lies may refer to:

 No More Lies (EP), an EP by Iron Maiden, or the title song
 No More Lies (audio drama), a 2007 Doctor Who audio drama
 No More Lies (The Moody Blues song), 1988
 No More Lies (Michel'le song), 1989